Mari Vihmand (born 17 May 1967 in Tallinn) is an Estonian composer.

From 1987 to 1995 she taught music theory at the Tallin Music High School

In 1997, she graduated from Estonian Academy of Music and Theatre. 1995–1997, she studied at Lyon Conservatory of Music in France.

Since 1992, she is a member of Estonian Composers' Union.

Since 1997, she lives in the town Bad Urach near Stuttgart.

Most of her work is chamber music

Style of music 
Vihmand's musical style is recognized for its restrainedly lyrical and freshly sentimental quality, while her music language is often described as poetic and expressive, with an emphasis on balancing the emotional and rational aspects. Her finely crafted sound qualities distinguish her music from others. Vihmand achieved international recognition for her orchestral piece "Floreo," which won the first prize in the category of under-30-year-olds at the UNESCO International Rostrum of Composers held in Paris in 1996. She was also awarded the Cultural Prize of the Republic of Estonia for her chamber opera "Lugu klaasist...Geschichte von Glas" (1995).

Works

 Laul õnnelikust Corydonist ja Phyllisest (for sopran and chamber ensemble, 1992)
 Sinfonie (1993)
 Lugu klassist (chamber opera, 1995)
 Armastuse valem (opera, 2008)

References

Living people
1967 births
Estonian composers